Tuyên Sơn Bridge is a bridge spanning the Han River in the city of Da Nang, Vietnam.

References

Road bridges in Vietnam
Bridges in Da Nang
Bridges completed in 2004